Aboubakary Koita (born 20 September 1998) is a Belgian professional footballer who plays as a forward for Belgian First Division A club Sint-Truiden.

Club career
Koita began playing his football career at the youth academy of FC Merksem at the age of 13, and quickly moved to the academies of Lyra and Geel where he broke into the first team.

On 9 June 2017, Koita signed a professional contract with Gent, keeping him at the club for 2 seasons. Koita made his professional debut with Gent in a 1-0 Belgian First Division A win over Anderlecht on 13 May 2018. 

On 19 July 2019, he signed a 4-year contract with Waasland-Beveren.

On 19 June 2021, he joined Sint-Truiden.

Personal life
Born in Belgium, Koita is of Senegalese descent.

References

External links
 
 Gent Profile
 Fox Sports Profile

1998 births
Living people
Footballers from Antwerp
Belgian footballers
Belgian people of Senegalese descent
K.A.A. Gent players
K.V. Kortrijk players
S.K. Beveren players
Sint-Truidense V.V. players
Belgian Pro League players
Challenger Pro League players
Association football forwards